Chervono-Chekhursky is a rural locality (a khutor) in Petropavlovskoye Rural Settlement, Petropavlovsky District, Voronezh Oblast, Russia. The population was 78 as of 2010. There are 5 streets.

Geography 
Chervono-Chekhursky is located 7 km southwest of Petropavlovka (the district's administrative centre) by road. Petropavlovka is the nearest rural locality.

References 

Rural localities in Petropavlovsky District, Voronezh Oblast